Acalmani may refer to:

Acalmani, Ayutla de los Libres, Guerrero, Mexico
Acalmani, Igualapa, Guerrero, Mexico